L'Altrofilm is an Italian entertainment company known for distributing independent and foreign films. Founded in 1998 by the director and producer Louis Nero. L'Altrofilm is a leading independent film motion picture distribution and production company in Italy.

List of L'Altrofilm films

 The Man Who Drew God (2021)
 The Broken Key (2017)
 Women Directors, talking on a blade (2014)
 The Mystery of Dante (2014)
 Rasputin (2011)
 La Rabbia (2008)
 Ex Drummer (2007)
 Hans (2006)
 Longtake (2005)
 Golem (2003)

External links
 

Film production companies of Italy
Entertainment companies established in 1998
Film distributors of Italy